Propose Day is celebrated in India on 8 February as a day to propose to one's significant other. A large number of young people give roses to propose to their prospective girlfriend or boyfriend. It is the second day in Valentines Week. Although Valentine's day is celebrated across whole world, Valentine week is something celebrated in India only. This week marks various festivities across India including Rose Day on the 7th.

See also
 National Hugging Day
 Valentine's Day

References

February observances
Days celebrating love